Faura is a municipality in the comarca of Camp de Morvedre in the Valencian Community, Spain.

The patron saint of this town is Saint Barbara. During some feast days there is an event in which the people of Faura hold a procession for the image of the virgin.

Faura itself lies between orange fields and has a historic past.

References

Municipalities in the Province of Valencia
Camp de Morvedre